Oktyabr or Oktyabr' may refer to:

Classical music
Oktyabr, more commonly known in English as October, a 1967 symphonic poem by Dmitri Shostakovich
Oktyabr' (opera) by Vano Muradeli 

Places
Oktyabr, Azerbaijan, a village in Azerbaijan
in Kyrgyzstan:
Oktyabr, Chüy, a village in Alamüdün District, Chüy Region
Oktyabr', Jalal-Abad, a village in Suzak District, Jalal-Abad Region
Oktyabr, Alay, a village in Alay District, Osh Region
Oktyabr, Kara-Kulja, a village in Kara-Kulja District, Osh Region
Oktyabr, Russia, name of several rural localities in Russia

Others
Oktyabr, a Russian literary magazine
Oktyabr, a Yiddish newspaper published in 1918–41
October: Ten Days That Shook the World (1928), a film by Sergei Eisenstein